Peter Hermes (8 August 1922 – 14 October 2015) was a German diplomat, best known for serving as West German Ambassador to the United States from 1979 to 1984 and West German Ambassador to the Holy See from 1984 to 1987.

Early life and military service
Hermes was born in Berlin, as the son of agricultural scientist and politician Andreas Hermes. He was drafted in 1941, and served in a penal battalion in 1944. He was captured by the Soviets.
His father founded the CDU in the Soviet occupation zone, but left in 1945. Peter Hermes left East Germany in 1950.

Diplomatic career
Beginning in 1953, he was trade negotiator for the Foreign Office, and Head of the Department of Foreign Trade and Development, and European economic integration.

He completed a doctorate degree in law. In 1955, he joined the Diplomatic Service. 
He eventually became Secretary of State at the Foreign Office from 1975 to 1979. He was Ambassador of the Federal Republic of Germany in Washington, from 1979 to 1984. He was Ambassador of the Federal Republic of Germany to the Vatican, from August 1984 to 1987.

After retirement, he became a member of the Commission for Contemporary History Association, and deputy chairman of the Association of the German Archaeological Institute. He is an honorary member of the German Archaeological Institute.

References

External links

 Article on Hermes on the Konrad-Adenauer-Stiftung website (German)

1922 births
Ambassadors of Germany to the United States
2015 deaths
German military personnel of World War II
Ambassadors of Germany to the Holy See
Knights Commander of the Order of Merit of the Federal Republic of Germany